Yu Xin (513-581) was a Chinese poet, politician, and writer of the Liang and Northern Zhou dynasties of medieval China. Yu Xin was one of the founders of the Xu-Yu literary style together with Xu Ling, and the author of a famous fu. His courtesy name was Zǐshān, and he was known as Yu Shin in Japan.

Life
Yu Xin was born and raised in Jiangling, which was once the capital of Chu. His family was wealthy and aristocratic, and Yu became an important official of the Liang dynasty.  As such, he served as the lover and patron of aspiring statesman Wang Shao.

In 554, Yu Xin was sent as an ambassador to the Western Wei in Chang'an, a mission that did not meet with success.  On the way to his mission, he visited Wang Shao, now an official censor, who rejected further advances.  After the fall of the Liang dynasty in 557, three of his children that remained in the Liang capital were executed. Yu was held in Chang'an for the rest of his life.

Works
Along with the poet and official Xu Ling and the fathers of both men, Yu is known for the Xu-Yu Style, which was known as "fancy and alluring". Perhaps his most famous poem is The Lament for the South, which James Hightower has described as the highest development of the fu form of poetry. A translation of this poem can be found in:
 .

See also
Classical Chinese poetry
Six Dynasties poetry
Xiaoxiang poetry

References

6th-century Chinese poets
6th-century Chinese writers
Liang dynasty poets
Liang dynasty politicians
Male poets
Northern Zhou people
Northern Zhou poets
Poets from Hubei
Politicians from Jingzhou